Nowhere Else is a rural locality in the local government area (LGA) of Kentish in the North-west and west LGA region of Tasmania. The 2016 census recorded a population of 40 for the state suburb of Nowhere Else.
It is a bounded rural locality on the island of Tasmania. It is located at latitude -41.366 and longitude 146.276. Located on Lake Barrington (Tasmania), Nowhere Else is 190km from Hobart, and 72km west of Launceston. The postcode is 7306.

History 
Nowhere Else was gazetted as a locality in 1957. The name is believed to originate from a road that led to a place with no name.

Geography
Lake Barrington forms the north-western boundary.

Road infrastructure

Route C143 (Nowhere Else Road) runs through from north-east to south-east.

References

Localities of Kentish Council